St. John's Seminary may refer to:

India
 St. John's Regional Seminary in Ramanthapur, Hyderabad.
 St. John's Regional Seminary (Philosophate) in Kothavalasa, Vizianagaram District, Andhra Pradesh

Ireland
St. John's College, Waterford

New Zealand
St. Johns Seminary in Auckland, New Zealand

United Kingdom
St. John's Seminary (Wonersh), Wonersh, Guildford, Surrey, England

United States
St. John's Seminary (California), Camarillo, California
Saint John's Seminary (Massachusetts), Brighton, Boston, Massachusetts
St. John's School of Theology-Seminary, College of Saint Benedict and Saint John's University in Collegeville, Minnesota
St. John's College Seminary, an institution at what is now Fordham University
 Saint John Vianney Seminary (Minnesota), a college seminary in Saint Paul, Minnesota
 Saint John Vianney Seminary (Denver), a theological seminary in Denver, Colorado
 Saint John Vianney Seminary (Miami), a college seminary in Miami, Florida

See also
Saint John's College (disambiguation)
Saint John's University (disambiguation)
St. John's School (disambiguation)
Saint John's (disambiguation)